Zinnia  haageana is a species of flowering plant in the family Asteraceae from Mexico. It is an annual which does not tolerate freezing temperatures, so in temperate zones must be sown under cover, and planted out when all danger of frost is past. The cultivar 'Aztec Orange', with double orange flowers, has received the Royal Horticultural Society's Award of Garden Merit.

References

External links
 
 

Flora of Mexico
haageana